Baqerabad (also Romanized as Bāqerābād; also known as Bāgerābād and Bāqerābād-e Zavāreh) is a village in Rigestan Rural District, Zavareh District, Ardestan County, Isfahan Province, Iran. At the 2006 census, its population was 18, in 4 families.

References 

Populated places in Ardestan County